was a Japanese magazine published by . Launched in October 1980 as a special issue of the anime magazine , it became a standalone publication in June 1983, and was discontinued in February 1984.

It launched at a time when June, the first commercial male-male romance magazine for a female audience in Japan (and which was also centered on the concept of ), had temporarily ceased publication.

History
The anime magazine  was launched by publishing company  in 1977, in response to the popularity of the anime series Space Battleship Yamato (1974–1975). A year later, Comic Jun (later re-named June) was launched by Sun Publishing. As a result of low sales, June temporarily ceased publication in 1979.

The first issue of Allan was published in October 1980 as a special issue of Gekkan Out. Starting from the June 1983 issue, it was launched as a bimonthly (every two months) publication independent from Gekkan Out. Allan ceased publication with its February 1984 issue.

Content
It also published reader submissions in a section titled . Although manga only constituted a small percentage of the editorial content of Allan, the manga series  by  became the magazine's signature work.

Contributors
Artist Akemi Matsuzaki contributed illustrations, posters, and covers to Allan, and serialized her manga series Bokura wa Seinen Tanteidan from the first until the final issue of the magazine. Many of the writers and artists who had contributed to June, such as Yasuko Aoike, Yayoi Takeda, and Hikomi Kugake, also contributed to Allan. Manga artist Akiko Hatsu, who coined the term  with Yasuko Sakata, made her professional debut as a manga artist in Allan.

Impact
Allan was one of the earliest commercial publications in Japan to focus on gay romance for a female audience. Writer Miki Ishida notes that while Allan dealt with the same  themes of June, it did so from a different perspective – notably, including features on the lives of real-life gay men – which she credits with helping to revitalize and diversify  as a genre.

Notes

References

Bibliography

1980 establishments in Japan
1984 disestablishments in Japan
Bi-monthly manga magazines published in Japan
Defunct magazines published in Japan
Magazines established in 1980 
Magazines disestablished in 1984 
Yaoi manga magazines